Gyrogyne is a genus of flowering plants belonging to the family Gesneriaceae.

Its native range is Southeastern China.

Species:
 Gyrogyne subaequifolia W.T.Wang

References

Didymocarpoideae
Gesneriaceae genera